The 2019 Kilkenny Senior Hurling Championship was the 125th staging of the Kilkenny Senior Hurling Championship since its establishment by the Kilkenny County Board in 1887. The championship began on 21 September 2019 and ended on 27 October 2019.

Ballyhale Shamrocks were the defending champions.

On 27 October 2019, Ballyhale Shamrocks won the championship after a 2-21 to 1-15 defeat of James Stephens in the final at UPMC Nowlan Park. It was their 17th championship overall and their second title in succession.

T. J. Reid from the Ballyhale Shamrocks club was the championship's top scorer with 1-34.

Team changes

To Championship

Promoted from the Kilkenny Intermediate Hurling Championship
 Graigue-Ballycallan

From Championship

Relegated to the Kilkenny Intermediate Hurling Championship
 Carrickshock

Results

First round

Relegation play-off

Quarter-finals

Semi-finals

Final

Championship statistics

Top scorers

Overall

Top scorers in a single game

References

External link

 Kilkenny GAA website

Kilkenny Senior Hurling Championship
Kilkenny Senior Hurling Championship
Kilkenny Senior Hurling Championship